The Mesotaeniaceae are a small family of unicellular green algae known as the "saccoderm desmids".   The Mesotaeniaceae appear to be sister or ancestral to the Zygnemataceae. The desmids are a deep branching group of Zygnemataceae. Spirotaenia was found to be a basal green alga.

Genera
The Mesotaeniaceae includes the following genera:

 Ancylonema Berggren, 1872
 Cylindrocystis Meneghini ex De Bary, 1858
 Geniculus Prescott, 1967
 Mesotaenium Nägeli, 1849
 Netrium (Nägeli) Itzigsohn & Rothe, 1856
 Nucleotaenium Gontcharov & Melkonian, 2010
 Planotaenium (Ohtani) Petlovany & Palamar-Mordvintseva, 2009
 Roya West & G.S.West, 1896
 Spirotaenia Brébisson, 1848   
 Tortitaenia A.J.Brook, 1998
Synonyms:
 Endospira Brébisson, nom. inval.,  is a synonym of Spirotaenia
 Entospira Kuntze, 1898 is a synonym of Spirotaenia
 Polytaenia A.J.Brook, 1997, nom. illeg., is a synonym of Tortitaenia

References 

Zygnematales
Zygnematophyceae families